Richard Roberts (1803–1841) was an Irish sea captain. He entered the Royal Navy in his youth and served with them until he gained the rank of Lieutenant, and was given command of the SS Sirius. With Roberts at the helm, the Sirius became the first steamship to travel across the Atlantic to America, in April 1838. Shortly afterward, he was transferred to the SS President, which was lost at sea in March 1841. Roberts is presumed to have gone down with the ship. Actor Tyrone Power, great-grandfather of the Hollywood movie star, was also a passenger and perished in the President.

Roberts loved the sea so, that he's quoted as saying "..I'd go to sea in a bath tub".

See also
The captain goes down with the ship
Tyrone Power

References 

[Reference:- Journal of the Cork Historical & Archaeological Society Vol.1 (1895), 156]

1803 births
1841 deaths
Irish sailors in the Royal Navy
English sailors
Deaths due to shipwreck at sea
Steamship captains
Royal Navy officers
British Merchant Navy officers
Captains who went down with the ship